Willen Lake is a visitor attraction and public park in Milton Keynes, Buckinghamshire The site is owned by The Parks Trust, an independent, self-funded charity that cares for and maintains over 6,000 acres of green space across MK.

Willen Lake is Milton Keynes's most popular park, attracting in excess of 750,000 visitors a year. It comprises 180 acres of landscaped parkland which surround around 100 acres of water across two lakes. Both lakes are balancing lakes, designed to mitigate flooding from the River Ouzel. The southern lake offers a wide range of activities on and off the water, whilst the northern lake offers a more natural and tranquil setting, ideal for quiet walks and spotting wildlife. There are large events held on the site throughout the year, including Comedy Central's FriendsFest

Attractions

Operating 
, the activities area of the park includes of a number of leisure attractions  including:

 Watersports centre (new centre opened 2021)
 High ropes course
 Wakeboarding course
 Children's outdoor playground
 Children's outdoor splash park
 Inflatable aqua park 
 Ridable miniature railway
 Outdoor fitness equipment
 Health club (including hair and beauty salon)
 Funfair
 Large events spaces
 Observation wheel
 Benugo Bar & Kitchen
 Premier Inn hotel, with bar open to non-residents.

Previous attractions 

 Miniature golf
 Outdoor amphitheatre

Geography 
The lake is one of the largest purpose-built stormwater balancing lakes in the UK. The lake is designed to take surface run-off from Milton Keynes, the largest of a number designed to do so. The lake has capacity for an additional level increase of 1.3 metres, equivalent to a once in 200 years event. Unlike most of the rest of the UK, Milton Keynes has separate storm and foul sewers, so sewage pollution is not a significant problem.

The lake is surrounded by a mixture of open parkland and woodland, which forms part of the wider Ouzel Valley Park.

References 

Milton Keynes
Lakes of Buckinghamshire